The 2005 Wake Forest Demon Deacons football team was an American football team that represented Wake Forest University during the 2005 NCAA Division I-A football season. In their fifth season under head coach Jim Grobe, the Demon Deacons compiled a 4–7 record and finished in fourth place in the Atlantic Division of the Atlantic Coast Conference.

Schedule

Team leaders

References

Wake Forest
Wake Forest Demon Deacons football seasons
Wake Forest Demon Deacons football